Al Wazzani (Al-Ouazzani), also known as Arab Louaize or Aarab El Louaizeh, is a small Lebanese village in the Hasbaya District of the Nabatieh Governorate, on the banks of the Hasbani River. The village is located about 1 km from the Wazzani Spring, a major source of the Hasbani, which is a tributary of the Jordan River. The village has about 200 residents.

In 2001 the Lebanese government installed a small pumping station with a 10 cm bore near the village, to supply water to the village as well the nearby villages al-Teiba and Ghajar. In March 2002 Lebanon also diverted part of the Hasbani to supply Wazzani village, an action that then Prime Minister of Israel, Ariel Sharon, said was a "casus belli" and could lead to war.
The pumping station was destroyed during the 2006 Lebanon War.

References

Populated places in Hasbaya District
Jordan River basin
Israel–Lebanon relations